The Roberts County Courthouse in Miami, Texas, at 301 E. Commercial St., was built in 1913.  It was listed on the National Register of Historic Places in 2004.

It was designed by architect Elmer George Withers, who designed at least 11 Texas courthouses, and was built by Bone and Parr Construction Co. It is Classical Revival in style.

It is a Texas State Antiquities Landmark and a Recorded Texas Historic Landmark.

The building is the second courthouse which served Roberts County, as it replaced a frame building used as courthouse in Parnell from 1889 to 1898 before it was moved to Miami.

It was deemed significant "for its role as the center of government for Roberts County" and "as an intact example of a Classical Revival style public building. The courthouse retains integrity of design, materials, workmanship, location, setting, association and feeling to a high degree."

See also

National Register of Historic Places listings in Roberts County, Texas
Recorded Texas Historic Landmarks in Roberts County
List of county courthouses in Texas

References

External links

Courthouses in Texas
Courthouses on the National Register of Historic Places in Texas
National Register of Historic Places in Roberts County, Texas
Neoclassical architecture in Texas
Government buildings completed in 1913